was a village located in Uma District, Ehime Prefecture, Japan.

As of 2003, the village had an estimated population of 1,653 and a density of 20.97 persons per km². The total area was 78.82 km².

On April 1, 2004, Shingū, along with the town of Doi (also from Uma District), the cities of Iyomishima and Kawanoe, was merged to create the city of Shikokuchūō.

Dissolved municipalities of Ehime Prefecture
Shikokuchūō